Höga Kusten Airport, translated High Coast Airport, by authorities such as IATA and Transportstyrelsen known as Kramfors-Sollefteå Airport, is an airport located between the towns of Kramfors and Sollefteå, Sweden . The airport is still named Kramfors on tickets and flight lists on other airports.

The number of passengers in 2017 was 11,396, dropping sharply from 62,000 in 2000 and 18,455 in 2012. The reason for this is low price flights from larger relatively nearby airports like Örnsköldsvik Airport and Sundsvall-Härnösand Airport and the 5 hour train to Stockholm (started 2012) (travel has not been reduced overall during this period, but the Kramfors passengers have to a large extent chosen other routes).

Airlines and destinations

Statistics

Transportation
Ground transport is by taxi, shared taxi, rental car or own car.

There is (since August 2012) a railway station on the Ådalen Line 1½ km (1 mile) from the airport. Taxi transfer is available, which should be prebooked.

See also
 List of the largest airports in the Nordic countries

References

External links
 Airport website

Airports in Sweden
Buildings and structures in Västernorrland County